"Song for a Winter's Night" is a song written by Gordon Lightfoot, and first recorded for his album The Way I Feel (1967). Lightfoot recorded another version of the song for Gord's Gold (1975), a greatest hits compilation on which other re-recordings also appeared.

Background 
The song was written on a hot summer night in Cleveland while Lightfoot was performing there. He was missing his wife of the time, Brita Ingegerd Olaisson, and his thoughts turned to winter.

Covers
Sarah McLachlan covered the song for the soundtrack to the 1994 film Miracle on 34th Street; her rendition also appears on her 1996 compilation album Rarities, B-Sides and Other Stuff, on her 2006 Christmas album Wintersong, and in the soundtrack for the TV series Due South.

Other artists who have covered the song include The Raftsmen (who retitled it "The Hands I Love"), on their 1967 album On Target; Harry Belafonte, on his 1967 album "Belafonte on Campus" (under the title "The Hands I Love"); Kenny Rankin, on his 1967 album Mind-Dusters; Catherine McKinnon, on her 1969 album Everybody's Talkin' ; Nana Mouskouri in French on her 1968 album Je Me Souviens and English on the 1969 album The Exquisite; Tony Rice, on his 1986 album Me & My Guitar; Schooner Fare, on their 1987 album Home for the Holidays; Quartette, on their 2003 album Beautiful: A Tribute to Gordon Lightfoot; Tommy Fleming, on his 2009 album Song for a Winter's Night; Reid Jamieson, on his 2012 album Songs for a Winter's Night; Sanna Nielsen on her 2013 Christmas album Min jul.; Blue Rodeo, on their 2014 album A Merrie Christmas to You; Goodnight, Sunrise as a standalone 2018 single; and Glass Tiger on their 2020 album "Songs For A Winter's Night".

References
Gordonlightfoot.com (fan site)

1967 songs
Gordon Lightfoot songs
Songs written by Gordon Lightfoot
American Christmas songs
Sanna Nielsen songs